Bartosz Piasecki (born 9 December 1986) is a Norwegian fencer.

Early life
Piasecki was born in Tczew in the Pomeranian Voivodeship, Poland but moved to Norway with his family when he was two years old. His father, Mariusz Piasecki is a fencing champion and coach who won 12 medals at the Polish Championships, and represented Poland at international competitions in the epee.  Bartosz Piasecki holds a bachelor's degree in computer science from the University of Oslo

Career
He won the silver medal in the men's individual épée at the 2012 Summer Olympics in London. Piasecki lives in Bestum in Oslo and competes for Bygdø Fekteklubb. A right-hand fencer, Piasecki is coached by his father, Mariusz Piasecki, and works as a math teacher at the elite sports program at Wang Secondary School in Oslo.

Bartosz Piasecki earned a bronze medal during the U23 European Fencing Championship in Debrecen in 2009. In June 2012 he ended with a 16th position at the 2012 World Championship in Italy.

Piasecki's silver medal at the Olympics is Norway's best achievement in this discipline in history. The second best was an 11th place at the 1984 games by Nils Koppang.

References

1986 births
Living people
Polish emigrants to Norway
People from Tczew
Sportspeople from Oslo
Norwegian male épée fencers
Olympic fencers of Norway
Olympic silver medalists for Norway
Olympic medalists in fencing
Fencers at the 2012 Summer Olympics
Norwegian schoolteachers
Mathematics educators
Medalists at the 2012 Summer Olympics
Fencers at the 2015 European Games
European Games medalists in fencing
European Games bronze medalists for Norway